Evaldas Kandratavičius is a Lithuanian professional athletic trainer, who has worked with some of the best professional basketball teams in Europe for multiple years, including: Lithuania men's national basketball team (debuted during the historic performance in 2010 FIBA World Championship), Lithuania women's national basketball team, CSKA Moscow (over 2 seasons), Lietuvos rytas Vilnius and many famous Women's National Basketball Association players. He graduated Lithuanian Sports University and successfully defended his dissertation in Lithuanian University of Health Sciences. He signed with BC Khimki in the summer of 2019.

References

Living people
Year of birth missing (living people)